Chalermpol Polamai (born 29 July 1982 in Pathumthani) is a Thai professional motorcycle racer. He races a Yamaha YZF-R6 in the MFJ All-Japan Road Race ST600 Championship.

Career statistics

Grand Prix motorcycle racing

By season

Races by year

Supersport World Championship

Races by year

 * Season still in progress.

External links

1982 births
Living people
Chalermpol Polamai
Moto2 World Championship riders
Chalermpol Polamai
Chalermpol Polamai